James Myers Danson  (1845 in Carnforth – 1909 in Aberdeen) was Dean of Aberdeen and Orkney from 1907 to 1909.

He was educated  at Ingleton School and Trinity College, Dublin and ordained deacon in 1871 and priest in 1873. His first post was as Assistant Chaplain of St. Mark's College, Chelsea. He was appointed the incumbent at St. Mary, Aberdeen in 1874; of St Mary, Arbroath in 1880; and of St. Andrew, Aberdeen in 1882, where he stayed until his death on 29 December 1909. He also published several books.

Notes

1845 births
1909 deaths
People from Carnforth
Alumni of Trinity College Dublin
Scottish Episcopalian clergy
Provosts of St Andrew's Cathedral, Aberdeen
Deans of Aberdeen and Orkney